Weekend Wogan was the incarnation of the Sunday morning show on BBC Radio 2 from 14 February 2010 to 8 November 2015. The show was presented by Sir Terry Wogan, which marked his return to the airwaves following his departure as presenter of the weekday breakfast show, in December 2009.

In its first year, the show was broadcast in front of a live audience in the BBC Radio Theatre, before moving to Western House, Radio 2's headquarters, where it remained until the end of its run.

Wogan hosted the show for the final time on Remembrance Sunday 2015, as his health was beginning to decline due to cancer. He died from this illness on 31 January 2016. The show's slot was filled with guest hosts until 29 November 2015 after which regular cover show Madeley on Sunday, presented by Richard Madeley, took over the slot temporarily. Michael Ball took over the slot on a permanent basis from April 2016, returning to the show he vacated in 2010 to allow Wogan to present.

The programme featured guests and live music from BBC Radio 2 studios at Western House in London. It was broadcast for approximately 40 Sundays a year, with the remaining 12 being taken by an interim show, which from May 2012 was Madeley on Sunday. Previously, until September 2011, the interim show was Michael Ball's Sunday Brunch.

History
Wogan confirmed to his listeners on 7 September 2009 that he would be leaving the breakfast show at the end of the year with Chris Evans taking over. He presented his final edition of Wake Up to Wogan on 18 December 2009, although by then it had been announced that Wogan would return to Radio 2 from 14 February 2010 to host a live weekly two-hour Sunday show, featuring live musical performance and guests, between 11:00 and 13:00.

The three 2010 series took place in front of a live audience in the Radio Theatre at Broadcasting House and had an original run of three months. Tickets for the first block of 12 shows had sold out within 24 hours. Wogan's first guests on his new show were actor Ian McKellen and jazz singers Norah Jones and Jamie Cullum. In its first year, the programme also featured a house band, led by musician Elio Pace.

In 2011 the televised version was decommissioned and Weekend Wogan was hosted from BBC Radio 2's studios in Western House.

On 3 July 2012 the BBC Trust ruled that Wogan had breached broadcasting guidelines following an edition in January of that year in which he made comments that appeared to make light of the Costa Concordia disaster, which had occurred nine days earlier. After playing "Rock the Boat" by The Hues Corporation he questioned whether it was an appropriate choice of song and joked about the Costa Concordia's captain. The ship ran aground and partially sank off the Italian Coast with the loss of lives.

Show format
Airing from 11am to 1pm every Sunday, Weekend Wogan featured a mix of live and recorded music, together with guest singers. The show also included celebrity interviews, as well as contributions from Wogan's listeners and regular guests such as, in its first year, the newsreader John Marsh. Features of the show included the infamous Janet and John stories featuring Marsh and which were a regular mainstay of Wake Up to Wogan. A podcast of the show was available online.

Wogan usually signed off the show saying "well, that's about the height of it" before thanking his guests and producers, previewing next week's show and playing his last record.

Throughout 2010 the show was also televised. Wogan was joined on stage by an eleven-piece house band led by musical director Elio Pace with backing vocals from Kirstie Roberts, Sue Acteson and Chloe Buswell. Video highlights of Weekend Wogan could also be viewed on the show's website from Mondays and on the Red Button.

Televised episodes

Series 1

Series 2

Series 3

References

External links
 

BBC Radio 2 programmes
British music radio programmes